Little Amyot Lake is a hamlet in Saskatchewan.

Unincorporated communities in Saskatchewan